Peritapnia is a genus of beetles in the family Cerambycidae, containing the following species:

 Peritapnia fabra Horn, 1894
 Peritapnia minima Chemsak & Linsley, 1978
 Peritapnia nudicornis (Bates, 1885)
 Peritapnia pilosa Chemsak & Linsley, 1978

References

Acanthoderini